Bacita Airport  is an airstrip serving Bacita in the Kwara State of Nigeria.

See also
Transport in Nigeria
List of airports in Nigeria

References

External links
Bing Maps - Bacita
OpenStreetMap - Bacita Airstrip

Airports in Nigeria